Samba is a town, municipal committee in the Samba Tehsil of the Samba District in the Union Territory of Jammu and Kashmir, India. It is the administrative headquarter of Samba district. Samba has his own railway station are Samba railway station on Jammu-Delhi railway line.

Geography
Samba District borders Udhampur District to the north, Kathua District to the east, Tehsils Jammu and Bishnah of Jammu District to the west, and the International Border Pakistan to the south.

Demographics

Overview

According to a report released by Census India 2011, the Samba Municipal Committee has population of 12,700, of which 6979 (55%) are males while 5721 (45%) are females. There are 1365 children under seven years old, or 10.75% of the population. There are 2566 households in the city,

Caste distribution 
By caste, 71% of Samba residents are from general caste, 28.57% are from schedule caste, and 0.04% are schedule tribes.

Religion
In Samba, Hinduism is the dominant religion, while, Christians, Muslims and Sikhs are the minorities.

Population growth 
The city's population decreased by 20.2% from 2001 to 2011. According to the 2001 census, Samba's total population was about 16,000. The female population growth rate was −8.1%, which was 19.9% higher than male population growth rate of −28%. The general caste population decreased by 27.9%, the schedule caste population increased by 8.5%, and the child population decreased by 24.7% between the two censuses.

Sex ratio 
According to the 2011 census, Samba has 820 females per 1000 males compared to the state average of 889 females per 1000 males. For children under seven years old, there are 806 girls per 1000 boys in the city, compared to the state average of 862 girls per 1000 boys. Between 2001 and 2011, Samba's overall sex ratio and child sex ratio have increased by 177 females per 1000 males and 36 girls per 1000 boys, respectively.

Employment 
In the census, a worker is defined as a person who does business or performs any job, service, cultivation, or labour activity. Of the population, 4356 (34%) are engaged in work or business activities. 91.80% of workers are engaged in Main Work (full-time), and 8.20% of workers are engaged in Marginal Work (part-time).

By sex, 3885 workers are males while 471 workers are females.

Landmarks

Mansar Lake 
Mansar Lake is located on the Samba–Udhampur Road  from Samba. The lake is surrounded by hills with different Hindu temples and attracts a large number of tourists and religious pilgrims in the area. A tourist complex comprising five tourist huts and rooms situated on the bank of the lake provides visitor accommodation. The state government has also established the Surinsar-Mansar Development Authority, which is responsible for implementation of tourism developmental projects in all four tourist destinations.

Villages and temples 
It is connected to Samba via the Purmandal–Utterbani–Vijaypur Road. Purmandal is known as "Chotta Kashi" and has old Shiva temples, which have religious importance, surrounded by the Shivalik Hills.

The temple Aap Shambhu Mandir is located in Jammu. 
Chichi Mata Mandir, a temple located within Samba, is one of the shaktipeeths where Goddess Sati's little finger fell.It is situated on National Highway only 2 km from Samba town and is very famous temple of the region. It attracts tourists and pilgrims throughout the year.

Terrorist attacks
On 26 September 2013, militants impersonating army personnel attacked the Hiranagar Police Station. The militants entered the army cantonment and opened fire. In a day-long operation and combat search, all three militants were killed. Twelve others, including a lieutenant colonel, were killed in this incident.

Higher educational institutes
Higher educational institutes in Samba include the following:

Bhargava Law College
 Central University of Jammu
 Pandit Prem Nath Dogra Government Degree College Samba
 Government Degree College (Vijaypur, Ramgarh, Purmandal, Ghagwal)
 Bhargava Degree College
 Bhargava College Of Engineering And Technology
 Dogra Degree College
 Dogra Law College
 RK Degree College

Transport

By Air
Samba is 31 km away from Jammu Airport in Jammu, Jammu and Kashmir, India

By Rail
There are regular trains from other major cities of the country to Samba. Railway Station(s): Samba Railway station (SMBX)

By Bus
Being on the National Highway 44 (old NH-1A), there are regular Buses plying from the other parts of the country connecting Samba.

References

Cities and towns in Samba district